Pondor is a small village in the Municipality of Tabor in central Slovenia. It lies on the edge of the Savinja Valley, just off the regional road from Vransko to Šempeter v Savinjski Dolini. The area is part of the traditional region of Styria. The municipality is now included in the Savinja Statistical Region.

References

External links
Pondor at Geopedia

Populated places in the Municipality of Tabor